Lemeltonia is a genus of flowering plants belonging to the family Bromeliaceae.

Its native range is Central America to north-western Peru and Trinidad. It is found in the countries of Belize, Brazil, Colombia, Costa Rica, Ecuador, French Guiana, Guatemala, Guyana, Honduras, Nicaragua, Panamá, Peru, Suriname, Trinidad-Tobago and Venezuela.

The genus name of Lemeltonia is in honour of Elton Martinez Carvalho Leme (b. 1960), a Brazilian botanist and specialist in Brazilian Bromeliaceae at a herbarium in Rio de Janeiro. It was first described and published in Phytotaxa Vol.279 on page 41 in 2016.

Known species
According to Kew;
Lemeltonia acosta-solisii 
Lemeltonia cornuta 
Lemeltonia dodsonii 
Lemeltonia monadelpha 
Lemeltonia narthecioides 
Lemeltonia scaligera 
Lemeltonia triglochinoides

References

Tillandsioideae
Bromeliaceae genera
Plants described in 2016
Flora of Central America
Flora of northern South America
Flora of western South America